Krishna Dvaipayana, better known as Vyasa or Vedavyasa (वेदव्यासः, Veda-vyāsaḥ, "the one who classified the Vedas"), is a revered sage portrayed in most Hindu traditions. He is traditionally regarded as the author of the epic Mahabharata. 

Vyasa is also regarded by many Hindus as a partial incarnation (aṃśa-avatāra) of the god Vishnu and the compiler of the mantras of the Vedas into four Vedas, as well as the author of the eighteen Puranas and the Brahma Sutras. He is one of the seven immortal Chiranjeevis, implying he is still alive in the current Kali yuga.

Name
Vyasa's birth name is Krishna Dvaipayana, which possibly refers to his dark complexion and birthplace, although he is more commonly known as "Veda Vyasa" (Veda Vyāsa) as he has compiled the single, eternal Veda into four separate books  Rigveda, Samaveda, Yajurveda and Atharvaveda.

The word "Vyasa" (Vyāsa) refers to "compiler," or, "arranger," and also means "separation," or, "division." Other meanings are "split," "differentiate," or, "describe." It is also a title, given to "a holy sage or a pious learned man," and applied to "persons distinguished for their writings."

Swami Vivekananda expresses the opinion that Vyasa may not have been a single person but a lineage of sages who were content to simply develop the ideas without claiming credit, as they were free from desire for the results of their work, and hence attributed the authorship to Vyasa.
He says that Vyasa being only a title, anyone who composed a new Purana was known by the name Vyasa.

Hindus traditionally hold that Vyasa subcategorized the primordial single Veda to produce four parts as a canonical collection. Hence he was called Veda Vyasa, or "Splitter of the Vedas," the splitting being a feat that allowed people to understand the divine knowledge of the Veda.

The Vishnu Purana elaborates on the role of Vyasa in Hindu chronology. The Hindu view of the universe is that of a cyclic phenomenon that comes into existence and dissolves repeatedly. Each kalpa cycle is presided over by a number of Manus, one for each manvantara, and each manvantara has a number of Yuga Cycles, each with four yuga ages of declining virtues. The Dvapara Yuga is the third yuga. The Vishnu Purana (Book 3, Ch 3) says:

According to the Vishnu Purana, Aswatthama, the son of Drona, will become the next sage (Vyasa) and will divide the Veda in 29th Maha Yuga of 7th Manvantara.

Attributed texts

The Mahabharata

Vyasa is traditionally regarded as the chronicler of this epic and also features as an important character in Mahābhārata. The first section of the Mahābhārata states that it was Ganesha who wrote down the text to Vyasa's dictation, but this is regarded by scholars as a later interpolation to the epic and this part of the story is also excluded in the "Critical Edition" of the Mahabharata. 

The five Pandava brothers of the junior line of the Kuru royal house being the ultimate victors, thus India's cultural heroes, Vyasa's relationship with the winners in this kinship war of cousin against cousin is as chronicler who sired the father of the victors. These five protagonists are the surrogate sons of Pandu, sired by various gods on behalf of this Kuru king whom Vyasa himself fathered 'under Niyoga practice' in place of an elder brother who died heirless, at the behest of his mother Satyavati. Vyasa also sired the father of the vanquished, he was certainly the surgeon who put the hundred brothers of antagonist cousins into incubation, and as they are only said to be sired by a boon he conferred on their mother, there's some possibility that he is also their biological sire himself. Hence Vyasa's authorship of the Mahabharata is by way of biography of his own family including its adoptees. This was the struggle between his own ex officio grandsons. And it is in the wake of producing this purportedly historical, smiriti Mahabharata as well as 'compiling' the essential sruti scripture of the Vedas that 'Vyasa' was added as epithet then eclipsed his two birth names, Krishna and Dvaipayana, while his smiriti creation became a canon whose territorial name, drawing on either one or two lengendary ruler's personal names, included in the saga's text, still underlies modern Sanskrit-to-Hindi official form, Bhārat Gaṇarājya, in the names for India through its current constitution.

Vyasa's Jaya (literally, "victory"), the core of the Mahabharata, is a dialogue between Dhritarashtra (the Kuru king and the father of the Kauravas, who opposed the Pāndavas in the Kurukshetra War) and Sanjaya, his adviser and charioteer. Sanjaya narrates the particulars of the Kurukshetra War, fought in eighteen days, chronologically. Dhritarashtra at times asks questions and expresses doubts, sometimes lamenting, fearing the destruction the war would bring on his family, friends and kin.

The Bhagavad Gita, Sanskrit, The Song of God, is contained in the Bhishma Parva which is chapters 23–40 of book 6 of the Mahabharata. The Gita, dated to the second half of the first millennium BCE, in its own right is one of the most influential philosophico-religious dialogues, producing numerous commentaries and a global audience. Like the "Jaya", it is also a dialogue, in which Pandava Prince Arjuna's hesitation to attack his cousins is counseled from 'the perspective of the gods' by his charioteer, revealed to be an avatar of Krishna. In 1981, Larson stated that "a complete listing of Gita translations and a related secondary bibliography would be nearly endless". The Bhagavad Gita has been highly praised, not only by prominent Indians including Mahatma Gandhi and Sarvepalli Radhakrishnan, but also by Aldous Huxley, Henry David Thoreau, J. Robert Oppenheimer, Ralph Waldo Emerson, Carl Jung, Herman Hesse, and Bülent Ecevit.

In the Mahabharata, large and elaborate lists are given, describing hundreds of kingdoms, tribes, provinces, cities, towns, villages, rivers, mountains, forests, etc. of the (ancient) Indian subcontinent (Bhārata Varsha). Additionally, he gives descriptions of the military formations adopted by each side on each day, the death of individual heroes and the details of the war-races. Eighteen chapters of Vyasa's Jaya constitute the Bhagavad Gita, a sacred text in Hinduism. The Jaya deals with diverse subjects, such as geography, history, warfare, religion and morality.

The 100,000 verses of Vyasa's work Mahābhārata is told by Vaishampayana to Janamejaya. It is structured as a narration by Ugrasrava surnamed Sauti, a professional storyteller, to an assembly of rishis who, in the forest of Naimisha, had just attended the 12-year sacrifice known as Saunaka, surnamed Kulapati. At 100,000 verses, the Mahābhārata is the longest epic poem ever written.

Other texts attributed

Puranas 

Vyasa is also credited with the writing of the eighteen major Purāṇas, which are works of Indian literature that cover an encyclopedic range of topics covering various scriptures. He narrated the Devi-Bhagavata Purana to Parikshit's son Janamejaya.

Brahma Sutras 
The Brahma Sutras, one of the foundational texts of Vedanta, is written by Badarayana also known as Veda Vyasa. Badarayana is also called Vyasa, which literally means "one who arranges".

In the Mahabharata

Birth
During her youth, Satyavati was a fisherwoman of Kaivartta clan who used to ferry people across river, to help her father. One day, she helped Parashara to cross the river Yamuna. He was enchanted by her beauty and wanted an heir from her. Initially, Satyavati did not agree, telling that if others would see them, then her purity would be questioned. Parashara created a secret place in bushes of a nearby island and a blanket of thick fog. She conceived and immediately gave birth to a son. Parashara named him Krishna Dvaipayana, referring to his dark complexion and birthplace. Dvaipayana became an adult and promised his mother that he would come to her when needed. Parashara restored Satyavati's virginity, gifted her an enchanting smell and left with his son. Satyavati kept this incident a secret, not telling even King Shantanu whom she was married to later.

Niyoga and birth of Vichitravirya's sons

Shantanu and Satyavati had two sons, named Chitrāngada and Vichitravirya. Both of them died early without leaving an heir, but Vichitravirya had two wives - Ambika and Ambalika. A widowed Satyavati initially asked her stepson, Bhishma, to marry both the queens, but he refused, citing his vow of celibacy. Satyavati revealed her secret past and requested him to bring her firstborn to impregnate the widows under a tradition called Niyoga. By this time, Vyasa had compiled the Vedas.

Sage Vyasa was unkempt because of months of meditation in the forest. Hence upon seeing him, Ambika who was rather scared shut her eyes, resulting in their child, Dhritarashtra, being born blind. The other queen, Ambalika, turned pale upon meeting Vyasa, which resulted in their child, Pandu, being born pale. Alarmed, Satyavati requested that Vyasa meet Ambika again and grant her another son. Ambika instead sent her maid to meet Vyasa. The duty-bound maid was calm and composed; she had a healthy child who was later named Vidura.

Connection with the Pandavas and Kauravas

When the children of Vichitravirya grew up, Bhishma got them married to different women. Dhritarashtra was married to Gandhari, princess of Gandhara. Pandu married Kunti and Madri. Pandu left the kingdom, leaving Dhritarashtra as the acting king. Gandhari, during her adolescence, received a boon to have a hundred children but her pregnancy was taking a long period of time. After two years of pregnancy, Gandhari aborted her developing fetus, giving birth to a hard mass that looked like an iron ball. Vyasa came to the kingdom and using his knowledge, he asked to divide the mass into one hundred and one-pieces and put them into pots for incubation. After a year, 101 babies were born. Meanwhile Pandu's wives, Kunti and Madri, were blessed with three and two sons respectively.

While everybody rejoiced at the news of the birth of the Pandavas and Kauravas, misery took place in the forest. Pandu, who was cursed, died because of his attempt to make love with Madri. Kunti and the Pandavas returned to Hastinapura. Vyasa, feeling sorrow for his mother's fate, asked her to leave the kingdom and come with him to live a peaceful life. Satyavati, along with her two daughters-in-law, went to the forest.

Disciples
Vyasa had a son named Shuka, who was his spiritual successor and heir. As per Skanda Purana, Vyasa married Vatikā, alias Pinjalā, who was the daughter of a sage named Jābāli. It is described that Vyasa's union with her produced his heir, who repeated everything that he heard, thus receiving the name Shuka (lit. Parrot). Other texts including the Devi Bhagavata Purana also narrate the birth of Shuka but with drastic differences. Vyasa was desiring an heir, when an apsara (celestial damsel) named Ghritachi flew in front of him in form of a beautiful parrot, causing him sexual arousal. He discharges his semen, which fell on some sticks and a son developed. This time, he was named Shuka because of the role of the celestial parrot. Shuka appears occasionally in the story as a spiritual guide to the young Kuru princes.

Besides his heir, Vyasa had four other disciples  Paila, Jaimini, Vaishampayana and Sumantu. Each one of them was given the responsibility to spread one of the four Vedas. Paila was the made the incharge of Rigveda, Jaimini of the Samaveda, Vaishampayana of the Yajurveda and Sumantu of Atharvaveda.

Vyasa is believed to have lived on the banks of Ganga in modern-day Uttarakhand. The site was also the ritual home of the sage Vashishta, along with the Pandavas, the five brothers of the Mahabharata.

Vyasa is also mentioned in the Sankara Digvijaya. He confronts Adi Shankara, who has written a commentary on the Brahma-Sutras, in the form of an old Brahmana, and asks for an explanation of the first Sutra. This develops into a debate between Shankara and Vyasa which lasts for eight days. Recognizing the old Brahmana to be Vyasa, Shankara makes obeisance and sings a hymn in his praise. Thereupon, Vyasa inspects and approves Shankara's commentary on the Brahma-Sutras. Adi Shankara, who was supposed to die at the end of his sixteenth year, express his desire to leave his body in the presence of Vyasa. Vyasa dissuades him and blesses him that he may live for another sixteen years to complete his work.

Festival
The festival of Guru Purnima is dedicated to Vyasa. It is also known as Vyasa Purnima, the day believed to be both of his birth and when he divided the Vedas.

In Sikhism
In Brahm Avtar, one of the compositions in Dasam Granth, Guru Gobind Singh mentions Rishi Vyas as an avatar of Brahma. He is considered the fifth incarnation of Brahma. Guru Gobind Singh wrote a brief account of Rishi Vyas's compositions about great kings— Manu, Prithu, Bharath, Jujat, Ben, Mandata, Dilip, Raghu Raj and Aj— and attributed to him the store of Vedic learning.

See also

 Chiranjivi
 Parashara
 Guru Gita
 Gnana Saraswati Temple, Basar
 Vedic mythology

Notes

References

Sources

Further reading
 The Mahabharata of Krishna-Dwaipayana Vyasa, translated by Kisari Mohan Ganguli, published between 1883 and 1896
 The Arthashastra, translated by Shamasastry, 1915
 The Vishnu-Purana, translated by H. H. Wilson, 1840
 The Bhagavata-Purana, translated by A. C. Bhaktivedanta Swami Prabhupada, 1988 copyright Bhaktivedanta Book Trust
 The Jataka or Stories of the Buddha's Former Births, edited by E. B. Cowell, 1895

External links
 
 
 
 The Mahābhārata – Ganguli translation, full text at sacred-texts.com

Ancient Indian philosophers
Hindu philosophers and theologians
Hindu poets
Epic poets
Rishis
Mahabharata
Characters in the Mahabharata
Characters in the Bhagavata Purana
Avatars of Vishnu
V
Chiranjivins
Writers about Kali (demon)